Varaprasadham is 1976 Indian Tamil-language drama film, directed by K. Narayanan. The screenplay was written by him, and the story by K. S. Mathangan. Music was by R. Govardhanam. The film stars Ravichandran, Jayachitra, Vijayakumar and M. N. Rajam, with Major Sundarrajan, S. A. Ashokan Manorama and Suruli Rajan in supporting roles. It was released on 13 April 1976.

Plot

Cast 
 Ravichandran
 Jayachitra
 M. N. Rajam
 Vijayakumar
 Major Sundarrajan
 S. A. Ashokan
 Manorama
 Suruli Rajan
 A. Sakunthala
 K. Kannan
 S. Rama Rao
 Jayachandran

Soundtrack 
Music was composed by R. Govardhanam. The lyrics were written by Pulamai Piththan and Valampuri John. Ilaiyaraaja did the background score for this film marking it his first background score in films.

References

External links 
 

1976 films
1970s Tamil-language films
Indian black-and-white films
1976 romantic drama films
Indian romantic drama films